Frans Van Looy  (26 August 1950 – 20 September 2019) was a Belgian cyclist. Looy was professional from 1972 to 1982. He competed in the individual road race at the 1972 Summer Olympics.

After his career as a cyclist, Van Looy worked as a team manager with Team Telekom and T-Mobile until 2006. and had helped run his family's farm in Merksem. However, a local government order ruled that Van Looy could no longer live at the farm, despite a petition signed by 3,000 people to preserve the residence that Van Looy had been born in.
After this order, which ruled his birthplace to be uninhabitable and led to his eviction, he committed suicide in September 2019.

Major wins
Sources:

1972
 4th Nationale Sluitingsprijs
1973
 1st Stage 6 Volta a la Comunitat Valenciana
 1st Stage 1 Tour du Nord
 1st Stage 1 Vuelta a Mallorca
 2nd Omloop van Oost-Vlaanderen
 5th Nationale Sluitingsprijs
 9th Grote Prijs Stad Zottegem
 10th Grand Prix de Denain
1974
 1st Schaal Sels
 1st Nationale Sluitingsprijs
 1st Stage 3 Critérium du Dauphiné Libéré
 7th E3 Harelbeke
 8th Dwars door België
1975
 2nd GP du Tournaisis
 2nd Paris–Tours
 3rd Tour du Condroz
 3rd Schaal Sels
 3rd Coppa Ugo Agostoni
 5th Kampioenschap van Vlaanderen
 6th Nationale Sluitingsprijs
 8th Scheldeprijs
1976
 1st Ronde van Limburg
 1st Leeuwse Pijl
 3rd Omloop van het Leiedal
 4th Scheldeprijs
 4th Omloop van de Vlaamse Scheldeboorden
 4th Paris–Tours
 9th Eschborn–Frankfurt
 9th Kampioenschap van Vlaanderen
1977
 1st Nokere Koerse
 1st Nationale Sluitingsprijs
 3rd Halle–Ingooigem
 5th Tour du Condroz
 8th Overall Three Days of Bruges–De Panne
 8th Grand Prix d'Isbergues
1978
 1st De Kustpijl
 1st GP Victor Standaert
 1st Grote Prijs Jef Scherens
 1st Stage 3a Volta Ciclista a Catalunya
 2nd GP du Tournaisis
 5th Overall Tour of Belgium
 6th Omloop van Oost-Vlaanderen
 8th Schaal Sels
 9th Overall Three Days of Bruges–De Panne
1st Stage 3
 10th De Brabantse Pijl
1979
 1st Stage 2 Vuelta a Aragón
 1st Nationale Sluitingsprijs
 2nd Grand Prix de Momignies
 3rd De Kustpijl
 3rd GP Victor Standaert
1980
 1st Halle–Ingooigem
 2nd De Kustpijl
 2nd Grote Prijs Jef Scherens
 4th Nokere Koerse
 10th Belgian National Road Race Championships
1981
 3rd De Kustpijl
 7th Nokere Koerse
1982
 3rd De Kustpijl

Grand Tour general classification results timeline

References

External links 
 

1950 births
2019 suicides
Belgian male cyclists
People from Merksem
Olympic cyclists of Belgium
Cyclists at the 1972 Summer Olympics
Cyclists from Antwerp
Suicides in Belgium